Eugoa gabrielae is a moth of the family Erebidae. It is found in Cambodia and Thailand.

References

 Natural History Museum Lepidoptera generic names catalog

gabrielae
Moths described in 2008